Asb Buni (also Romanized as Āsb Būnī; also known as Asbeh Būnī) is a village in Kharajgil Rural District, Asalem District, Talesh County, Gilan Province, Iran. At the 2006 census, its population was 47, in 19 families.

References 

Populated places in Talesh County